In Greek mythology, Pheres (Phéres, modern pronunciation Féris) was the founder of Pherae in Thessaly.

Family 
Pheres was the son of Cretheus, King of Iolcus and Tyro. He was the brother of Aeson and Amythaon. He fled from Iolcus after his half-brother, Pelias, seized the throne. Pheres married Periclymene, daughter of Minyas, and became the father of Admetus, Lycurgus, Eidomene (wife of Amythaon), Periopis (possible mother of Patroclus) and Antigona (mother of Asterius). Of them, Admetus was the husband of the famous Alcestis, who died in his stead and was rescued by Heracles, while Pheres, despite his old age, would not do the same for his son.

Mythology 
In Aeschylus' Eumenides Pheres is mentioned by the Chorus of Erinyes of Clytemnestra. The Erinyes were the avengers for the mother-blood Orestes spilled by ordering of Apollo. The Chorus leader argues with Apollo over the just sentence Athena and her panel of judges are about to speak.

Notes

References 

 Aeschylus, translated in two volumes. 2. Eumenides by Herbert Weir Smyth, Ph.D. Cambridge, MA. Harvard University Press. 1926. Online version at the Perseus Digital Library. Greek text available from the same website.
 Apollodorus, The Library with an English Translation by Sir James George Frazer, F.B.A., F.R.S. in 2 Volumes, Cambridge, MA, Harvard University Press; London, William Heinemann Ltd. 1921. . Online version at the Perseus Digital Library. Greek text available from the same website.
 Euripides, Alcestis with an English translation by David Kovacs. Cambridge. Harvard University Press. 1994. Online version at the Perseus Digital Library. Greek text available from the same website.
 Gaius Julius Hyginus, Fabulae from The Myths of Hyginus translated and edited by Mary Grant. University of Kansas Publications in Humanistic Studies. Online version at the Topos Text Project.

Mythological kings of Pherae
Kings in Greek mythology
Princes in Greek mythology
Characters from Iolcus
Mythological city founders